Sphingomonas sediminicola  is a bacterium from the genus of Sphingomonas which has been isolated from freshwater sediments from the Daecheong Bank near Daejeon in Korea.

References

Further reading

External links
Type strain of Sphingomonas sediminicola at BacDive -  the Bacterial Diversity Metadatabase

sediminicola
Bacteria described in 2013